Papyrus Oxyrhynchus 62 (P. Oxy. 62) is a letter from a centurion, written in Greek. The manuscript was written on papyrus in the form of a sheet. It was discovered by Grenfell and Hunt in 1897 in Oxyrhynchus. The document was written on 6 January 222. Currently it is housed in the Bodleian Library (Ms. Gr. Class. d 61) in Oxford. The text was published by Grenfell and Hunt in 1898.

The letter was addressed to Syrus, acting strategus of Oxyrhynchus, by a centurion of unknown name. It concerns a shipment of wheat. The recto side of the papyrus contains a description of a judicial process, but it is too mutilated to read.  The measurements of the fragment are 260 by 72 mm.

The verso side was written after 246 CE.

See also 
 Oxyrhynchus Papyri
 Papyrus Oxyrhynchus 61
 Papyrus Oxyrhynchus 63

References 

062
3rd-century manuscripts